The GE AC44C6M is an AC-traction  diesel locomotive, rebuilt from GE Transportation Systems  Dash 9  locomotives. AC44C6M rebuilds have been done by GE (now Wabtec), American Motive Power, Inc., and Norfolk Southern Railway's Juniata and Roanoke Shops, starting in September 2015. The AC44C6M retains the 16-cylinder 7FDL-16 prime mover used in the core locomotive prior to rebuilding, but replace the Dash 9's DC traction motors with alternating current GE 5GEB13B7 traction motors. Externally, the rebuilds have received new wide-nosed cabs, a new front hood section, and a new inverter cabinet behind the cab, while retaining the underframe and engine and radiator compartments of the original Dash 9 units. 

Rebuilding an old Dash 9 locomotive into an AC44C6M costs only 50-60% that of purchasing a brand new AC locomotive.  Wabtec claims a 17% improvement in fuel efficiency, 30% improvement in reliability, and a 55% improvement in haulage capability.

History
Norfolk Southern was the launch customer and is the largest operator of this model, with over 500 locomotives rebuilt as of 2022.  All of their Dash 9-40C units, and significant numbers of their Dash 9-40CW units have been rebuilt into AC44C6Ms. The railway plans to rebuild all of its remaining Dash 9–40CW units into AC44C6Ms. 
Norfolk Southern's AC44C6M locomotive features a new under-floor air conditioner, cab signals, LSL (Locomotive Speed Limiter), DPU systems, PTC, and ECP braking ability. 

Quebec North Shore and Labrador Railway has 19 AC44C6M locomotives. These were rebuilt from former BNSF Dash 9 locomotives. 

Fortescue Metals Group has 28 AC44C6M locomotives. These feature a larger radiator than other AC44C6M rebuilds. 

Union Pacific also announced plans to rebuild 75 of their Dash 9 locomotives into AC locomotives, presumably AC44C6Ms, as part of a large order to rebuild much of their GE locomotive fleet  Union Pacific is a major customer of the similar AC4400CWM rebuild program.

A Canadian National AC44C6M rebuild was spotted outside of a Wabtec facility in early September 2022.  This was later revealed to be an order for 50.

The AC4400CWM is a similar rebuild program undertaken by GE/Wabtec, but starts with an AC4400CW instead of a Dash 9. Union Pacific, CSX, and Canadian Pacific Railway have rebuilt AC4400CW's into AC4400CWM's. 

The AC44C4M is a similar rebuild program undertaken by GE and BNSF, but AC44C4M locomotives feature 4 traction motors and an A1A-A1A configuration rather than the AC44C6M's 6-traction motors in a C-C configuration. This is similar to the ES44C4 and ET44C4 that BNSF also operates.  These locomotives also retain their original cabs. BNSF has so far been the only customer of the AC44C4M, with 20 locomotives as of 2022.

Operators

References

Further reading

 
 
 

Dash 9-40C
C-C locomotives
Diesel locomotives of the United States
Freight locomotives
Norfolk Southern Railway locomotives
Standard gauge locomotives of the United States
Railway locomotives introduced in 1995